Kimmo Albin Innanen (March 12, 1937 – August 3, 2011) was a Canadian astrophysicist of Finnish descent.

Early life and education 
Kim grew up in Toronto. His first language was Finnish. He obtained a bachelor's degree in engineering physics with honors from the University of Toronto. In 1960, he received his master's degree in applied mathematics at the University of Waterloo. He completed his doctorate at the University of Toronto in 1964.

Career 
In 1966, he joined the Department of Physics (later Physics and Astronomy) at York University. His research in celestial mechanics, galactic dynamics, and later in Solar System applications and asteroids, led to the publication of more than 100 papers. In 1990, with Seppo Mikkola, he predicted the existence of Mars Trojans, confirmed by subsequent discovery and, in 1997, he was involved in the discovery of the Earth's first co-orbital companion asteroid, 3753 Cruithne. He served as the dean of science from 1986 to 1994.

He received an honorary degree from the University of Turku in 1995. The asteroid (3497) Innanen was named in his honor in 1992.

See also
 List of University of Waterloo people

References 

1937 births
2011 deaths
Canadian astrophysicists
University of Toronto alumni
University of Waterloo alumni
University of Western Ontario alumni
Canadian people of Finnish descent